Meike Fröhlich (born 10 July 1979) is a German former professional tennis player.

Fröhlich reached a career high singles ranking of 227 in the world while competing on the professional tour and won three ITF titles, including a $25,000 event at Valladolid in 1997. She featured in the qualifying draw for the 1999 Budapest Open, losing in the first round to Adriana Serra Zanetti.

ITF finals

Singles: 6 (3–3)

Doubles: 4 (1–3)

References

External links
 
 

1979 births
Living people
German female tennis players